Kelly Jean Van Dyke (June 5, 1958 – November 17, 1991) was an American actress and adult film performer. She was the daughter of actor Jerry Van Dyke, niece of the actor Dick Van Dyke, and first cousin once removed of Shane Van Dyke. As an actress, she was known for such television programs as My Mother the Car.

Personal life 
In May 1991, Kelly married actor Jack Nance. They had met in rehab, as both had struggled with drug and alcohol addictions. Kelly was also "trying to shed nefarious connections to the porn industry in which she had dabbled under the name Nancee Kelley."

Death 

Kelly Van Dyke-Nance committed suicide on November 17, 1991. 

Her husband, Jack Nance was in Bass Lake, California, filming Meatballs 4 at the time. Van Dyke had relapsed and had resumed making pornography in order to fund her addictions. During a phone call with Van Dyke, Nance stated he wanted to end their marriage as he could not watch her "destroy herself." Van Dyke then said she would "kill herself if he hung up on her.” Moments later a storm took out the line and the phone went dead. Subsequently, it took over 45 minutes for Nance and director Bobby Logan to find a working phone. After reaching the nearest town's sheriff office, an officer contacted Los Angeles police. They broke in, finding that the 33-year-old Van Dyke had hanged herself.

References

External links
 
 

1958 births
People from Danville, Illinois
American pornographic film actresses
American television actresses
Suicides by hanging in California
20th-century American actresses
Kelly Jean
Actresses from Illinois
1991 suicides